Red Mountain (Washington) may refer to:
 Red Mountain (Benton County, Washington)
 Red Mountain (King County, Washington)
 Red Mountain (Kittitas County, Washington)
 Red Mountain (Skagit County, Washington)